The 2018–19 Greek Basketball Cup was the 44th edition of Greece's top-tier level professional national domestic basketball cup competition. The previous winners of the cup were AEK. The cup competition started on 15 September 2018 and ended on 17 February 2019. Panathinaikos won the competition.

Format
The top six placed teams from the top-tier level Greek Basket League's 2016–17 season, gained an automatic bye to the 2017–18 Greek Cup quarterfinals. While the eight lower placed teams from the 2016–17 Greek Basket League season; along with all of the teams from the 2nd-tier level Greek A2 Basket League's 2017–18 season, and the 3rd-tier level Greek B Basket League's 2017–18 season, played in preliminary rounds, competing for the other two quarterfinals places. The quarterfinals and onward rounds were played under a single elimination format.

Preliminary rounds

Phase 1

Round 1
Saturday  2018–09–15

Round 2
Wednesday 2018–09–19

Note: Aiolos Trikalon decided to forfeit their game against Faiakas Kerkyras.

Round 3
Saturday 22 or Sunday 2018–09–23

Phase 2

Round 1
Wednesday 2018–09–26

Round 2

Final rounds

Note: Olympiacos decided to forfeit their semifinals game versus Panathinaikos at halftime, over reffing disputes.

Awards

Finals Most Valuable Player

Finals Top Scorer

References

External links
 Official Hellenic Basketball Federation Site 
 Official Greek Basket League Site 
 Official Greek Basket League English website 

Greek Basketball Cup
Cup